Articles (arranged alphabetically) related to the Azerbaijan Republic include:

0–9
26 Baku Commissars -
26 Commissars Memorial -
1993-2016 military reforms in Azerbaijan -
1994 Baku Metro bombings -
1995 Baku Metro fire -
2000 Baku earthquake -
2007 Baku terrorist plot

A
.az -
Abbasgulu Bakikhanov -
Abdulla Shaig -
Abdurahman Fatalibeyli -
Abulfaz Elchibey -
Absheron -
Afag Masud -
Afrasiyab Badalbeyli -
Ag-Gol National Park -
Agdam (rayon) -
Agdash -
Aghasi Mammadov -
Aghstev -
Agjabadi -
Agstafa -
Agsu -
Ajami Nakhchivani -
Ak Koyunlu -
Alakbar Rezaguliyev -
Alazani -
Alexander Kazembek (Russian orientalist) -
Alexander Nevsky Cathedral, Baku -
Ali Bayramli -
Ali Ismayilov -
Ali Kerimli -
Ali-Agha Shikhlinski -
Aliguluushagi -
Alihan Samedov -
Alimardan Topchubashev -
Alliance Party for the Sake of Azerbaijan -
Almas Ildyrym -
Altaic languages -
Altyaghach National Park -
Always (album) -
Amaras Monastery -
Amina Figarova -
Amiraslan Isgandarov -
Anar Rzayev -
Anatoliy Banishevskiy -
Andre Luiz Ladaga -
Andrei Dobrokhodov -
ANSAD-Petrol Neftçala -
Anthem of Azerbaijan SSR -
Aras River -
Area codes in Azerbaijan -
Arif Malikov -
Armenian Apostolic Church -
Armenian language -
Armenian National Council of Karabagh -
Armenian-Azerbaijani War -
Armenian-Tatar massacres -
Armenians -
Army of Azerbaijan -
Arran (Caucasus) -
Arshin Mal Alan (operetta) -
Artsakh -
Artsakh State Museum -
Artur Rasizade -
Asaf Zeynally -
Ashik -
Ashik Kerib -
Asia -
Askeran -
Askeran clash -
Aslan Kerimov -
Asma kasma -
Association of Scouts of Azerbaijan -
Astara, Azerbaijan -
Astara (rayon) -
Atabeg -
Atabegs of Azerbaijan -
Atropatene -
Aturpatakan -
Avar language -
Avarı -
Avrami Aslanbegov -
Ayaz Mutallibov -
Aygun Kazimova -
Ayran -
Ayrums -
Azal Avia Cargo -
Azat ou Ankakh Artsakh -
Azerbaijan -
Azerbaijan-the OIC relations - 
Azerbaijan Air Force -
Azerbaijan Air Defense Force -
Azerbaijan Airlines -
Azerbaijan America Alliance -
Azerbaijan and GUAM relations-
Azerbaijan and the European Union -
Azerbaijan at the 2004 Summer Olympics -
Azerbaijan–Belgium relations -
Azerbaijan Border Guard -
Azerbaijan Coast Guard -
Azerbaijan Communist Party
Azerbaijan Communist Party (1993) -
Azerbaijan Communist Party (on Platform of Marxism-Leninism)
Azerbaijan Cup -
Azerbaijan Democratic Republic -
Azerbaijan Democratic Party -
Azerbaijan Hope Party -
Azerbaijan–Germany relations -
Azerbaijan Gymnastics Federation -
Azerbaijan Liberal Party -
Azerbaijan in the Eurovision Song Contest -
Azerbaijan Interior Guard -
Azerbaijan International Operating Company -
Azerbaijan International University -
Azerbaijan Investment Holding -
Azerbaijan National Guard -
Azerbaijan National Independence Party -
Azerbaijan–NATO relations -
Azerbaijan–Netherlands relations -
Azerbaijan and Organization for Economic Co-operation -
Azerbaijan–OBSEC relations -
Azerbaijan–OSCE relations -
Azerbaijan Political Party of Democratic Reforms -
Azerbaijan Popular Front Party -
Azerbaijan Social Democratic Party -
Azerbaijan Social Prosperity Party -
Azerbaijan State Academic Opera and Ballet Theatre -
Azerbaijan State Agricultural Academy -
Azerbaijan State Carpet Museum
Azerbaijan State Economic University -
Azerbaijan State Museum of Art -
Azerbaijan State Russian Drama Theatre -
Azerbaijan Medical University -
Azerbaijan Navy -
Azerbaijan-Portugal relations -
Azerbaijan SSR -
Azerbaijan State Oil Academy -
Azerbaijan State Philharmonic Hall -
Azerbaijan Technical University -
Azerbaijan Trade Unions Confederation  -
Azerbaijan–United States relations -
Azerbaijan University of Languages -
Azerbaijani hip hop -
Azerbaijani language -
Azerbaijani literature -
Azerbaijani manat -
Azerbaijani National Council -
Azerbaijan national rugby union team -
Azerbaijani diplomatic missions -
Azerbaijani parliamentary election, 1990 -
Azerbaijani parliamentary election, 1995–1996 -
Azerbaijani parliamentary election, 2000–2001 -
Azerbaijani parliamentary election, 2005 -
Azerbaijani people -
Azerbaijani presidential election, 2003 -
Azerbaijani rug -
Azercell -
Azeri TV Tower -
Azeri-Chirag-Guneshli -
Azerbaijanis in Armenia -
Azerbaijanis in Russia -
Aziza Mustafa Zadeh -
Aziza Mustafa Zadeh (album) -
AzTV -
Azərbaycan Respublikasının Dövlət Himni

B
Baba Samit -
Bağlama -
Baháʼí Faith -
Baháʼí Naw-Rúz -
Bakhtiyar Vahabzadeh -
Baklava -
Baku -
Baku-Rostov highway bombing -
Baku-Tbilisi-Ceyhan pipeline -
Baku Academy of Music -
BakuBus -
Baku City Executive Committee -
Baku Congress Center-
Baku Governorate -
Baku International Jazz Festival -
Baku Khanate -
Baku Metro -
Baku Oil Fields -
Baku Polytechnicum -
Baku Private Turkish School -
Baku Slavic University -
Baku State University -
Baku Stock Exchange -
Baku Transport Agency -
Balakan -
Balakishi Arablinski -
Banine -
Barda, Azerbaijan -
Barda (rayon) -
Barkhudarli -
Barzavu -
Basut-Chay State Reserve -
Battle of Baku -
Battle of Chalagan -
Battle of Chaldiran -
Battle of Kelbajar -
Battle of Shamkor -
Bazardüzü Dağı -
Bella Davidovich -
Beylagan -
Beylagan (town) -
Bilasuvar -
Black January -
Black Sea Forum for Partnership and Dialogue -
Book of Dede Korkut -
Branobel -
Brilliant Dadashova -
Bulbul (singer) -
Bulbuljan -
Bulla Island -
Buzlukh

C
Capture of Shusha -
Caspian expeditions of the Rus -
Caspian Sea -
Caspian Guard Initiative -
Caspians
Caucasian Albania -
Caucasian Albania alphabet -
Caucasian Avars -
Caucasus -
Caucasus Germans -
Caucasus Mountains -
Caucasus Viceroyalty (1785–1796) - 
Caucasus Viceroyalty (1844–1881) -
Centrocaspian Dictatorship -
Children’s rights in Azerbaijan -
Chilov -
Chingiz Mustafayev (journalist) -
Chingiz Sadykhov -
Chirag Gala -
Christianity in Azerbaijan -
Chupanids -
Church of Kish -
Church of the Immaculate Conception, Baku (1912) -
Church of the Immaculate Conception, Baku -
Cinema of Azerbaijan -
City of Winds -
Civic Solidarity Party -
Civil Union Party -
Climate of Azerbaijan -
Coat of arms of the Azerbaijan SSR -
Coat of arms of Nagorno-Karabakh -
Committee for Oil Industry Workers' Rights -
Commonwealth of Independent States -
Communications in Azerbaijan -
Compatriot Party -
Conscription in Azerbaijan -
Contrasts -
Copyright Agency of the Republic of Azerbaijan -
Copyright law in Azerbaijan -
Council of Europe -
COVID-19 pandemic in Azerbaijan -
Criminal Code of Azerbaijan -
Culture of Azerbaijan -
Custom and traditions in Azerbaijan

D
Daf -
Daliboz -
Dance of Fire -
Daria Timoshenko -
Dashkasan -
Davachi -
Demographics of Azerbaijan -
Deodoraki -
Dilara Aliyeva -
Dolma -
Doymenj - 
Duduk

E
East Slavic languages -
Eastern Christianity -
Eastern Europe -
Eastern Orthodox Church -
ECO Cup -
Ecological Issues in Azerbaijan -
Economic Cooperation Organization -
Economic development in Azerbaijan -
Economic history of Azerbaijan-
Economic regions and districts of Azerbaijan -
Economy of Azerbaijan -
Economy of Baku -
Eldar Mahmudov -
Eldar pine-tree State Reserve -
Elections in Azerbaijan -
Eleventh Army (Soviet Union) -
Elisabethpol Governorate -
Eliza Mustafa Zadeh -
Elmar Huseynov -
Elnara Kerimova -
Elshan Hajizadeh -
Emil Sutovsky -
Emma Hagieva -
Empress Alexandra Russian Muslim Boarding School for Girls -
Ernani Pereira -
Erivan Governorate -
Europe -
European Neighbourhood Policy -
Evan Siegel -
Extreme points of Azerbaijan -
Eynulla Fatullayev

F
Family structure of Azerbaijan -
Farid Mansurov -
Farman Salmanov -
Farrukh Gayibov -
Farrukh Yassar -
Fatali Khan Khoyski -
Fatma Gadri -
Fauna of Azerbaijan -
Fikret Amirov -
Finance in Azerbaijan -
Firearms policy in Azerbaijan -
Fire Temple of Baku -
First Nagorno-Karabakh War -
Firudin bey Kocharli -

Fizuli -
Flag of Azerbaijan -
Flag of Nagorno-Karabakh -
Fuad Aslanov -
FC AMMK Baku -
FC Sahdag Qusar -
FK Baku -
FK Gäncä -
FK Gänclärbirliyi Sumqayit -
FC Inter Baku -
FK Karabakh -
FK Karvan -
FK Khazar Lenkoran -
FK MKT Araz Imisli -
FK Olimpik Baku -
FK Shamkir -
Flora of Azerbaijan -
Footballers of Azerbaijan
Foreign relations of Azerbaijan -
Forum of Azerbaijani Students in Europe (FASE)
Franghiz Ali-Zadeh -
Freedom (Azerbaijan)

G
Gadabay -
Gamar Almaszadeh -
Gandzasar monastery -
Ganja (city) -
Ganja Airport -
Ganja State University -
Gara Garayev -
Gara-Gel State Reserve -
Gara-Yaz State Reserve -
Garachi -
Garry Kasparov -
Gavril Ilizarov -
Genrich Altshuller -
Geography of Azerbaijan -
Georgian language -
Georgians -
German Caucasus Expedition -
Germans in Azerbaijan -
Getashen -
Gey-Gel State Reserve -
Ghazanchetsots Cathedral -
Gilan Qäbälä -
Gilavar -
Gizil-Agach State Reserve -
Gobustan State Reserve -
Goranboy -
Goychay -
Goygol (city) -
Goygol (lake) -
Goygol (rayon) -
Great Order Party -
Greater Caucasus -
Grigory Korganov -
Grigory Petrov -
GUAM Organization for Democracy and Economic Development -
Gurban Gurbanov

H
Hadrut -
Hagigat Rzayeva -
Haji Khanmammadov -
Haji-Mirza Hassan Roshdieh -
Hajigabul -
Hamida Omarova -
Hamlet Isakhanli -
Hanafi -
Hasan Hasanov -
Hazi Aslanov -
Healthcare in Azerbaijan-
Heydar Aliyev -
Heydar Aliyev Palace -
Heydar Aliyev International Airport -
Heydarabad -
Hirkan National Park -
Hinduism in Azerbaijan -
History of Azerbaijan -
History of Baku -
History of Nagorno-Karabakh -
History of Nagorno-Karabakh (1918-1923) -
Holy Myrrhbearers Cathedral -
House of Hasan-Jalalyan -
Housing in Azerbaijan -
Human rights in Azerbaijan -
Huseyn Javid -
Huseyn Khan Nakhichevanski -
Huseyngulu Sarabski

I
Ibrahim I of Shirvan -
Ibrahim Khalil Khan -
Igor Lukanin -
Igor Pashkevich -
Ildeniz -
Ilgar Gurbanov -
Ilham Aliyev -
Ilisu State Reserve -
Ilkhanate -
Imadaddin Nasimi -
Imair Airlines -
Imam Mustafayev -
Imishli -
In That Distant Neighboring Village -
Individual Partnership Action Plan -
Indo-European languages -
Indo-Iranian languages -
Inner City (Baku) -
Inspiration (Aziza Mustafa Zadeh album) -
Intellectual Property Law in Azerbaijan-
Investment in Azerbaijan -
Investments of Azerbaijan -
Irada Ashumova -
Iranian languages -
Isa Gambar -
Isgandar Hamidov -
Islam in Azerbaijan -
Ismail I -
Ismailli -
Ismailli State Reserve -
ISO 3166-2:AZ -
Israfil Mamedov -
Ittihad -
Ivan Blagov -
Ivan Fioletov

J
Jabrayil -
Ja'fari jurisprudence -
Jafar Jabbarly -
Jahan Talyshinskaya -
Jalil Mammadguluzadeh -
Jalilabad -
Javanshir -
Javad Khan -
Javad Malik-Yeganov -
Javid Taghiyev (boxer) -
Jazziza -
Jeyhun Hajibeyov -
Jovdat Hajiyev -
Józef Gosławski (Russian architect) -
Judaism in Azerbaijan -
Judiciary of Azerbaijan -
Juhuri language -
Julfa, Azerbaijan (city) -
Julfa (rayon) -
Justice Party (Azerbaijan)

K
Kalbajar -
Kamancheh -
Kanach Zham -
Kangarli (rayon) -
Kara Koyunlu -
Karabakh -
Karabakh carpet -
Karabakh horse -
Karabakh khanate -
Karapapak -
Karki (Azerbaijan) -
Kebab -
Kerim Kerimov -
Khalaj language (Iranian) -
Khalilullah I -
Khanlar Safaraliyev -
Khazar University -
Khazars -
Khazri -
Khinalyg -
Khizi -
Khojali -
Khojavend -
Khojavend (town) -
Khojaly Massacre -
Khudat -
Khurshidbanu Natavan -
Khyrdalan -
Kirovabad Pogrom -
Kristin Fraser -
Kura River -
Kura-Araxes culture -
Kurdamir -
Kurdish language -
Kurdish people -
Kurdistan Uyezd -
Kurmanji -
Kypchak languages

L
Labour rights in Azerbaijan -
Lachin (rayon) -
Lachin corridor -
Lahıc, Goygol -
Lahıc, Ismailli -
Lahıc, Zaqatala -
Lala Shevket -
Landmine situation in Nagorno Karabakh -
Languages of Azerbaijan -
Lankaran (rayon) -
Latif Gandilov -
Latif Safarov -
Lavash -
League for the Liberation of the Peoples of the USSR -
Leandro Melino Gomes -
Legal reform in Azerbaijan -
Lesser Caucasus -
Lev Landau -
Lev Nussimbaum -
Leyla Vakilova -
Lezgian language -
Lezgins -
LGBT rights in Azerbaijan -
List of airports in Azerbaijan -
List of Azerbaijani Jews -
List of Azerbaijanis -
List of Azerbaijani boxers -
List of Azerbaijani futsal players -
List of Azerbaijani Paralympic competitors -
List of Azerbaijani soups and stews -
List of Azerbaijan legislation -
List of Baku metro stations -
List of birds of Azerbaijan -
List of cities in Azerbaijan -
List of football clubs in Azerbaijan -
List of Israeli ambassadors to Azerbaijan -
List of mammals of Azerbaijan -
List of National Heroes of Azerbaijan -
List of newspapers in Azerbaijan -
List of Northwestern Iranian languages =
List of people on stamps of Azerbaijan -
List of political parties in Azerbaijan -
List of presidential trips made by Ilham Aliyev-
List of renamed cities in Azerbaijan -
List of Southwestern Iranian languages -
List of World Heritage Sites in Azerbaijan -
Lotfi Asker Zadeh -
Lutfali Abdullayev

M
Madina Gulgun -
Magsud Ibrahimbeyov -
Mahmud Gurbanov -
Mahsati -
Maiden Tower (Baku) -
Mammed Amin Rasulzade -
Mammed Said Ordubadi -
Manaf Suleymanov -
Manat -
Maraghar Massacre -
March Days -
Mardakert -
Mardakert and Martuni Offensives -
Martuni District (NKAO) -
Martuni Province -
Martyrs' Lane -
Maryam Bayramalibeyova -
Marziyya Davudova -
Masally -
Masud ibn Davud -
Mazun -
Mehdi Huseynzade -
Mehman Azizov -
Mehriban Aliyeva -
Meshadi Azizbekov -
Meskhetian Turks -
Meykhana -
Mikayil Mushfig -
Military of Azerbaijan -
Military history of Nagorno-Karabakh -
Mingachevir -
Mingachevir Polytechnic Institute -
Mingachevir reservoir -
Middle East -
Ministry of National Security of Azerbaijan -
Mir Hasan Vazirov -
Mir Jafar Baghirov -
Mir Mohsun Navvab -
Mirza Alakbar Sabir -
Mirza Davud Huseynov -
Mirza Fatali Akhundov -
Mirza Shafi Vazeh -
Mizrahi Jews -
Modern Equality Party -
MOIK Baku -
Molla Nasraddin (magazine) -
Molla Panah Vagif -
Molokan -
Momine Khatun Mausoleum -
Motherland Party (Azerbaijan) -
Mountain Jews -
Movlud Miraliyev -
Mstislav Rostropovich -
Mugham -
Mugham Festival -
Mughan Soviet Republic -
Multiculturalism in Azerbaijan -
Munavvar Kalantarli -
Murtuza Mukhtarov -
Musa Manarov -
Musa Nagiyev -
Musavat -
Music of Azerbaijan -
Muslim Magomayev (composer) -
Muslim Magomayev (musician) -
Muslim Social Democratic Party

N
Nabran -
Naftalan, Azerbaijan -
Nagorno-Karabakh -
Nagorno-Karabakh Autonomous Oblast -
Nagorno-Karabakh constitutional referendum, 2006 -
Nagorno-Karabakh Defense Army -
Nagorno-Karabakh presidential election, 2007 -
Najaf bey Vazirov -
Nakhichevan Airport -
Nakhichevan Autonomous Republic -
Nakhichevan Autonomous Soviet Socialist Republic -
Nakhichevan City -
Nakhichevan khanate -
Nakhichevan State University -
Namig Abdullayev -
Naqareh -
Nardaran -
Nariman Gasimoglu -
Nariman Narimanov -
Natig Rasulzade -
National Academy of Sciences of Azerbaijan -
National Assembly of Azerbaijan -
National Assembly of Nagorno Karabakh -
National Library of Azerbaijan -
National parks of Azerbaijan -
National Unity (Azerbaijan) -
Natural Resources of Azerbaijan -
Nature of Azerbaijan -
Neftchala -
New Azerbaijan Party -
Nezami Mausoleum -
Nigar Shikhlinskaya -
Nikolay Gikalo -
Nikolai Morozov (figure skater) -
Nina Fisheva -
Nizami Bahmanov -
Nizami Ganjavi -
Nizami Museum of Azerbaijan Literature -
Nizami Pashayev -
Nizami Street -
Northeast Caucasian languages -
Nowruz

O
Odlar Yurdu University -
Oghuz languages -
Oguz -
Oil industry in Azerbaijan -
Oil Rocks -
Old Udi script -
Operation Ring -
Ordubad (city) -
Ordubad (rayon) -
Ordubad National Park -
Organisation of Islamic Cooperation -
Organization of the Black Sea Economic Cooperation -
Orography of Azerbaijan -
OSCE Minsk Group

P
Palace of the Shirvanshahs -
Pamphylia Tanailidi -
Panah Ali Khan -
Parigala -
Partnership for Peace -
Pastırma -
Paytakaran -
Persian language -
Persianate society -
PFC Neftchi -
PFC Turan Tovuz -
Pir Huseyn Khanqah -
Pirallahı Island -
Pirgulu State Reserve -
Piruz Dilenchi -
Plov -
Polad Sabir Sirajov -
Polikarp Mdivani -
Politics of Azerbaijan -
Politics of Artsakh  -
Porak -
Port Ilich -
Pottery in Azerbaijan -
President of Azerbaijan -
President of Artsakh -
Prime Minister of Azerbaijan -
Prime Minister of the Nagorno-Karabakh Republic -
Principality of Khachen -
Privatization in Azerbaijan -
Prokopius Dzhaparidze -
Provisional Military Dictatorship of Mughan -
Public holidays in Azerbaijan -
Pyotr Kotlyarevsky

Q
Qabala (rayon) -
Qajar dynasty -
Qafqaz University -
Qax -
Qazakh -
Qırmızı Qəsəbə -
Qizilbash -
Qobustan -
Quba -
Quba Khanate -
Qubadli -
Qusar

R
Rafael Allahverdiyev -
Rafiq Tağı -
Ramana, Azerbaijan -
Ramil Safarov -
Rashad Sadygov -
Rashid Behbudov -
Rasim Başak -
Rasul Guliyev -
Reformist Communist Party of Azerbaijan -
Reforms in Azerbaijan -
Religion in Azerbaijan -
Renewable energy sources in Azerbaijan -
Republic of Aras -
Republic of Mountainous Armenia -
Richard Sorge -
Rivers and lakes in Azerbaijan -
Roman Catholicism in Azerbaijan -
Roya (singer) -
Rubaba Muradova -
Russian Empire -
Russian language -
Russian Orthodox Church -
Russians -
Russo-Persian War (1722-1723) -
Russo-Persian War (1804-1813) -
Russo-Persian War (1826-1828) -
Ruslan Khairov -
Ruslan Majidov -
Rustam Ibrahimbeyov -
Rustam Mustafayev -
Rutul language -
Rutuls -
Yalchin Rzazadeh

S
Saatly -
Sabirabad -
Sadarak -
Sadigjan -
Safavid dynasty -
Saingilo -
Sajids -
Salatyn Asgarova -
Samad bey Mehmandarov -
Samad Vurgun -
Samukh -
Sarsang reservoir -
Sattar Bahlulzadeh -
Science Development Foundation (Azerbaijan) -
September Days -
Sergei Rylov -
Sergei Yesenin -
Sevda Alekperzadeh -
Seventh Truth -
Shaddadid -
Shafi`i -
Shah Deniz gas field -
Shahbuz -
Shahbuz State Reserve -
Shahin Imranov -
Shahumian -
Shakhriyar Mamedyarov -
Shaki -
Shaki (rayon) -
Shaki Khanate -
Shakili Alasgar -
Shamakhi -
Shamans (album) -
Shamkir -
Shamsi Badalbeyli -
Sharur -
Shia Islam -
Shikhov Beach -
Shirali Mislimov -
Shirvan -
Shirvan Khanate -
Shirvan National Park -
Shirvan State Reserve -
Shirvani Arabic -
Shirvanshah -
Shovkat Alakbarova -
Shovkat Mammadova -
Shusha -
Shusha (rayon) -
Siazan -
Silk Way -
Silk Way Airlines -
Slavic languages -
Small and medium-sized enterprises in Azerbaijan-
Soltan Hajibeyov -
South Caucasus -
South Caucasus Pipeline -
Southwest Asia -
Soviet Union -
Special State Protection Service of Azerbaijan-
St. Gregory the Illuminator's Church, Baku -
State Employment Service (Azerbaijan) -
State Oil Company of Azerbaijan -
State Reserves of Azerbaijan -
State Security Service of the Republic of Azerbaijan -
Stepan Shahumyan -
Stepanakert -
Subuk -
Sufism -
Suleyman Sani Akhundov -
Sumgait Pogrom -
Sumqayit -
Sumqayit State University -
Sunni Islam -
Surakhany -
Synagogues in Azerbaijan -
Süreyya Ağaoğlu

T
Tahir Salahov -
Talish-i Gushtasbi -
Talysh Khanate -
Talysh language -
Talysh people -
Talysh-Mughan Autonomous Republic -
Tar (lute) -
Tartar (rayon) -
Tat language (Caucasus) -
Tatar language -
Tatars -
Tatiana Zatulovskaya -
Tat people (Caucasus) -
Teimour Radjabov -
Teymur Bayramalibeyov -
The Congress of World Azerbaijanis -
The European Azerbaijan Society (TEAS) -
The Opera of Koroglu -
Thomas Goltz -
Tofig Guliyev -
Tofik Bakhramov -
Togrul Narimanbekov -
Topchubashi family -
Tovuz (rayon) -
Transcaucasian Democratic Federative Republic -
Transcaucasian SFSR -
Transport in Azerbaijan -
Treaty of Gulistan -
Treaty of Kars -
Treaty of Turkmenchay -
Tsakhur language -
Tsakhur people -
Tskhouk-Karckar -
Tulipa armena -
Turan Air -
Turian-Chay State Reserve -
Turkey-Azerbaijan relations -
Turkic languages -
Twelvers -
"Ty kto takoy? Davay, do svidaniya!"

U
Udi language -
Udi people -
Ukrainian language -
Ukrainians -
United Communist Party of Azerbaijan -
United States Ambassador to Azerbaijan -
Utik -
Uzeyir Hajibeyov -
Uzundara -
United Nations General Assembly Resolution 60/285 -
United Nations General Assembly Resolution 48/114

V
Vagif Dzavadov -
Vagif Mustafazadeh -
Vagit Alekperov -
Vali Gasimov -
Vandam -
Vasif Adigozal -
Vasif Asadov -
Vasif Talibov -
Vilayat Guliyev -
Virtue Party (Azerbaijan) -
Visa policy of Azerbaijan -
Vladimir Rokhlin -
Vladimir Makogonov -
Voghdji -
Vugar Alakparov -
Vulf

W
Water supply and sanitation in Azerbaijan -
Western Iranian languages -
Western University -
Wildlife of Azerbaijan -
Whole Azerbaijan Popular Front Party

Y
Yakov Zevin -
Yanar Dag -
Yardymli -
Yaşar Aliyev -
Yerazi -
Yerevan state Azerbaijan dramatic theater -
Yevlakh  -
Yevlakh (rayon) -
Yosef Shagal -
Yuksak Liqa

Z
Zabit Samedov -
Zagatala State Reserve -
Zağulba -
Zangilan -
Zaqatala (rayon) -
Zaqatala (city) -
Zardab -
Zdroj -
Zemfira Meftahatdinova -
Zeynalabdin Shirvani -
Zeynalabdin Taghiyev -
Ziya Bunyadov -
Zoroastrianism in Azerbaijan -
Zurna

See also

 Lists of country-related topics

Azerbaijan